Astragalus glaux is a species of milkvetch in the family Fabaceae, native to the western Mediterranean. It is a camephyte.

References

glaux
Flora of Southwestern Europe
Flora of Morocco
Flora of Algeria
Flora of Tunisia
Taxa named by Carl Linnaeus
Plants described in 1753